

Erich Fronhöfer (27 December 1895 – 12 January 1970) was a German general in the Wehrmacht of Nazi Germany during World War II.

Awards and decorations

 Knight's Cross of the Iron Cross on 24 July 1941 as Oberstleutnant and commander of Panzer-Regiment 10

1895 births
1970 deaths
People from East Prussia
German Army personnel of World War I
Prussian Army personnel
Major generals of the German Army (Wehrmacht)
Recipients of the Knight's Cross of the Iron Cross
Recipients of the clasp to the Iron Cross, 1st class